The Philmont Leadership Challenge is a seven-day adult leadership training program of the Boy Scouts of America. It is intended for adults who have completed Wood Badge and is held once or twice each year in the back country of the Philmont Scout Ranch.

Program content
Participants live outdoors and receive advanced training in outdoor skills. They are expected to apply what they learned during Wood Badge including team building, ethical decision making and servant leadership. They utilize the Scouting COPE course and are given additional instruction in  wilderness first aid, advanced GPS use, and search and rescue techniques. Unlike the Wood Badge program, which is delivered through a lecture classroom environment and in a short outdoor camping experience, the entire Philmont Leadership Challenge is outdoors.

The adults are formed into teams and establish a base camp at Rayado Ridge Leadership Camp at about  elevation, where they live in Philmont canvas tents on wooden platforms. They practice Leave No Trace camping. 

Participants are asked to write an agreement to take home what they learned and put it to use. This includes applying their improved skills by training their home unit and council leadership staff.

Attendance requirements
Attendees must have completed or been a staff member of the Wood Badge program. They must be in good physical condition, satisfying Part D of the National Health and Medical Requirements, which is required for all participants who attend a high-adventure program.
Adults who completed Wood Badge (you may still be working on your ticket), and who have served on staff as an adult for either National Youth Leadership Training or National Advanced Youth Leader Experience programs can also attend. Participants do not have to be nominated by their local council and can apply directly.

Cost and dates
During 2012, the program fee was $470 if paid before January 2012, or $495 after January 1. This fee includes all meals and lodging, training materials, and a course patch. This cost excludes transportation to and from Philmont. Two courses are being offered during 2012, The first is from September 16–22 at Philmont.

West coast pilot test
A four-day pilot course was hosted by the Marin Council, in California from July 10–14, 2012, at Camp Tamarancho. Participants only need to satisfy the requirements of Part C of the National Health and Medical Requirements. An NYLT program for youth will be held on the same days and at the same camp.

References

Leadership training of the Boy Scouts of America
Youth organizations based in the United States